A Gate Through the Past  is the début full-length album by the Italian symphonic power metal band Holy Knights. It was first released in Japan on January 23, 2002 via Tokuma and re-released by Underground Symphony worldwide on June 5.

Track listing

Background and production
Holy Knight was formed in 1998; their first demo recording, Gate Through the Past was released in December 1999 to positive reviews. Having signed a record deal with Underground Symphony in April 2000, the band entered the Zenith Recording studio in Lucca in early November; the recording was finished on December 20.

Music
A Gate Through the Past'''s sound has been described as bombastic, with many compositions strongly influenced by neoclassical music, despite the fact that none of the band members had formal classical training. Elements of folk and baroque music are evident as well, contributing to the overall medieval atmosphere, while prominent orchestration and choirs add to the symphonic feel. The album was inspired by the fellow power metal bands Royal Hunt, Stratovarius and Rhapsody. When addressing the criticism of being a clone of the latter, the guitarist Danny Merthon and the drummer Claus Jorgen responded that they consider such comparison a compliment due to that band's artistic achievements.

Furthermore, Merthon, the band's principle lyricist, stated to had been inspired by Thomas Malorys compilation Le Morte d'Arthur'' and the interplay between legends and reality. The album's main lyrical theme is a knight's quest, his dream and nightmare and the challenge of discerning good from evil.

Credits
 Dario Di Matteo (as Mark Raven) – vocals, keyboards
 Salvatore Graziano (as Danny Merthon) – guitars
 Federico Madonia – guitars
 Vincenzo Noto (as Syl Raven) – bass
 Claudio Florio (as Claus Jorgen) – drums

References

External links
 "Gate Through the Past" on Last.fm

2002 albums
Underground Symphony albums
Holy Knights albums